Uroballus octovittatus is a species of spider of the genus Uroballus. It is endemic to Sri Lanka.

This species is known from a female and a male specimen. From the other Uroballus species described up to 2014, only females were collected.

References

Salticidae
Endemic fauna of Sri Lanka
Spiders of Asia
Spiders described in 1902